The Reformed Ogboni Fraternity, also known as the R.O.F, is an international fraternal organization. It is commonly described by initiates as a syncretic blend of the Ogboni system of Yorubaland and various external elements.

History
The Reformed Ogboni Fraternity was founded on the 18th of December, 1914. It was started as an alternative of the Aborigine Ogboni Fraternity for practitioners of Christianity, and its founder was the Anglican cleric T.A.J. Ogunbiyi.

Founding members that joined him in starting the fraternity included Prince Orisadipe Obasa, his wife Princess Charlotte Blaize Obasa of the R.B. Blaize family, and Prince M. Akinsemoyin of the Akinsemoyin royal family. Prince Obasa was recognized by the founders as the first Oluwo, or master, in the same year.

Although the fraternity was started both by and for the Christian elite, it has since grown in scope, and today its membership includes aristocratic followers of different faiths. External elements that influenced the fraternity's founders during its creation included everything from the early Christianity of Nigeria (as manifested in the local chapter of the Keswick Convention) to English Freemasonry.

Notable members
Notable members of the fraternity have included:
 Sir Adeyemo Alakija (who served as Olori Oluwo, or grandmaster, of the fraternity)  
 Chief Ladoke Akintola
 Sir Adetokunbo Ademola (who also served as Olori Oluwo) 
 King Olubuse II, the Ooni of Ife 
 Sir Ladapo Ademola, the Alake of Egbaland 
 King George VI of the United Kingdom and the Dominions 
 Dr. Nnamdi Azikiwe
 Sir Ahmadu Bello 
Chief Olusegun Obasanjo
Chief Francis Meshioye (As of 2023,  he is the current Olori Oluwo)

Controversies
The organization has been alleged to be a secret cult partaking in human sacrifices, although no cogent evidence has ever substantiated this. In an exposé on occultism titled Occult Grandmaster Now in Christ, a Nigerian best seller written in 1993 by Iyke Nathan Uzorma, the organization was alleged to be engaging in "Rajo witchcraft" which had little to no credence as the author didn’t explain, nor elaborate on what Rajo witchcraft meant . On December 19, 2019, Francis Meshioye the Olori Oluwo (which in English means the supreme leader of the organization) negated any alleged claim of wrong doing on the part of the organization and expressly stated that there was nothing sinister about it.

References

Further reading
 

Society of Nigeria
Nigerian culture
Black elite
Fraternal orders
1914 establishments in Nigeria